Shaun Anthony Linford Wallace (born 2 June 1960) is an English barrister, lecturer and television personality. He is one of the six "chasers" on the ITV quiz show The Chase. Wallace is a part-time lecturer and visits schools, colleges and other institutions to educate students on aspects of law. In 2004, he won Mastermind and was ranked 286th in the World Quizzing Championships in 2012.

Career

Law
Wallace was called to the Bar in November 1984 and in 1986 completed pupilage. He has taken part in hearings held at both the Old Bailey as well as several magistrates' courts located in England and Wales and also in Scotland. He was a member of Farringdon Barristers Chambers until February 2012, when it was announced that he had joined Great James Street Chambers.

On 26 October 2016, Wallace was found to have failed to comply with his duty while representing a defendant in criminal proceedings.  He was reprimanded and fined £2500.

Wallace is also a member of the southeastern circuit of the Criminal Bar Association. Owing to his heritage, he has been a member of the Jamaican Bar since 1999.

Television

In 2004, Wallace became a champion of the BBC general knowledge quiz, Mastermind, which also tests a contestant's aptitude on a subject of their choice. His specialist subject in the final was FA Cup Finals.

Wallace was a finalist on the first series of Are You an Egghead?, narrowly losing out to Barry Simmons.

Other shows that he has been a contestant on include Fifteen to One and The Weakest Link, plus the British adaptation of Greed.

Since 2009, Wallace has appeared as a "chaser" on the UK television series The Chase, a teatime game show which airs on ITV. His nickname on the show is "The Dark Destroyer". The other chasers are Anne Hegerty, Paul Sinha, Mark Labbett, Jenny Ryan and Darragh Ennis. He also appears on The Chase: Celebrity Special, The Family Chase, and Beat The Chasers. In 2018, he featured as a guest chaser on the Australian version of the show, alongside fellow UK chasers Hegerty and Labbett. In Australia, he is known as "The Destroyer" owing to Australian concerns the original nickname contained racial undertones, which Wallace himself disputed.

In 2018, his autobiography, Chasing the Dream, was released.

In 2019, Wallace appeared on the celebrity version of Catchphrase. He also appeared as a guest in "Dictionary Corner" on the Channel 4 gameshow Countdown. Wallace took part in the "Junk Food Experiment" in 2019.

In June 2020, Wallace appeared as an assistant in Alan Carr's Epic Gameshow, for Take Your Pick! In October 2020, Wallace appeared as a Black history month reporter for Good Morning Britain. In November 2020, Wallace took part as a contestant in ITV's Don't Rock the boat, a rowing competition show.

Qualifications
 BA (Hons), barrister, Inns of Court School of Law.
 Alumnus, Polytechnic of North London.
 Honorary Doctorate of Law awarded in July 2015 from London Metropolitan University.

Political activity and public activism

At the 2005 UK general election, Wallace stood as an independent parliamentary candidate, standing in the Brent South constituency in north London. He obtained 1% of the vote, losing to Labour's Dawn Butler.

In 2022, he supported the criminal barristers' industrial action over pay. Joining colleagues on a picket line outside the Supreme Court in London, Wallace said that legal aid fees should be increased to encourage young people and those from a diversity of backgrounds to become barristers.

Personal life
Shaun Anthony Linford Wallace was born on 2 June 1960 at Central Middlesex Hospital in London. He grew up in Wembley and attended Copland School. He is of Jamaican heritage and is the eldest of four children. He is a football fan and a supporter of Chelsea.

In 2022, Wallace appeared on the ITV programme DNA Journey, which revealed many details about his ancestry in Nigeria, Jamaica and many other African countries.

Television

References

External links
 

1960 births
Living people
Lawyers from London
Television personalities from London
English barristers
English television personalities
English people of Jamaican descent
Black British television personalities
Contestants on British game shows
Alumni of the Inns of Court School of Law